Kerpiçköy is a village in the District of Haymana, Ankara Province, Turkey.

The village is populated by Kurds. Kerpic Koyu was the first Kurdish village.

References

Villages in Haymana District
Kurdish settlements in Ankara Province